The Administration Committee is a select committee of the House of Commons in the Parliament of the United Kingdom. It has a remit "to consider the services provided for and by the House of Commons".

Membership
As of July 2022, the members of the committee are as follows:

2017-2019 Parliament
Members were announced on 30 October 2017.

Changes 2017-2019

2015-2017 Parliament
Members were announced on 20 July 2015.

Changes 2015-2017

2010-2015 Parliament
Members were announced on 26 July 2010.

Changes 2010-2015

See also
Parliamentary committees of the United Kingdom

References

External links
Records for this Committee are held at the Parliamentary Archives

Select Committees of the British House of Commons